The Hudson-Jones House is a historic house in rural Clark County, Arkansas. It is a handsome Greek Revival structure,  stories tall, with a single-story addition to the rear. Its most distinctive feature is a full Greek Revival portico with triangular pediment, supported by paired columns. The house was built c. 1840, and survives with most of its outbuildings intact.

The house was listed on the National Register of Historic Places in 1982.

See also
National Register of Historic Places listings in Clark County, Arkansas
List of the oldest buildings in Arkansas

References

Houses on the National Register of Historic Places in Arkansas
Greek Revival houses in Arkansas
Houses completed in 1837
Houses in Clark County, Arkansas
National Register of Historic Places in Clark County, Arkansas